Conor Noß (born 1 January 2001) is a professional footballer who plays as a midfielder for Borussia Mönchengladbach. Born in Germany, he is a youth international for the Republic of Ireland.

Career

Club career
Noß began playing football with SF Vorst in 2008, and moved to the youth academy of Mönchengladbach in 2009. On 7 July 2021, he signed his first professional contract with the club for 3 years. On 20 November 2021, Noß debuted for Gladbach during a 4-0 Bundesliga win over Greuther Fürth.

International career
Noß was born in Germany to a German father and Irish mother. He is a youth international for the Republic of Ireland U19s and U21s.

References

External links
 
 Bundesliga Profile

2001 births
Living people
Footballers from Düsseldorf
Republic of Ireland association footballers
Republic of Ireland under-21 international footballers
Republic of Ireland youth international footballers
German footballers
Irish people of German descent
German people of Irish descent
Citizens of Ireland through descent
Association football forwards
Bundesliga players
Regionalliga players
Borussia Mönchengladbach players
Borussia Mönchengladbach II players